Nasigram is a village in Bhatar CD block in Bardhaman Sadar North subdivision of Purba Bardhaman district in the state of West Bengal, India with total 1,708 families residing.

History
Census 2011 Nasigram Village Location Code or Village Code 319845. The village of Nasigram is located in the Bhatar tehsil of Burdwan district in West Bengal, India.

Transport 

Population 
Nasigram village, most of the villagers are from Schedule Caste (SC). Schedule Caste (SC) constitutes 38.81% while Schedule Tribe (ST) were 0.63% of total population in Nasigram village.

Population and house data

Healthcare
Nearest Rural Hospital at Bhatar (with 60 beds) is the main medical facility in Bhatar CD block. There are primary health centres.

School
NASIGRAM HIGH SCHOOL (H.S) 

NASIGRAM GIRLS F.P. SCHOOL.

References 

Villages in Purba Bardhaman district